Arylsulfatase (EC 3.1.6.1, sulfatase, nitrocatechol sulfatase, phenolsulfatase, phenylsulfatase, p-nitrophenyl sulfatase, arylsulfohydrolase, 4-methylumbelliferyl sulfatase, estrogen sulfatase) is a type of sulfatase enzyme with systematic name aryl-sulfate sulfohydrolase. This enzyme catalyses the following chemical reaction

 	an aryl sulfate + H2O  a phenol + sulfate

Types include:
Arylsulfatase A (also known as "cerebroside-sulfatase")
Arylsulfatase B (also known as "N-acetylgalactosamine-4-sulfatase")
Steroid sulfatase (formerly known as "arylsulfatase C")
ARSC2
ARSD
ARSE
ARSF
ARSG
ARSH
ARSI
ARSJ
ARSK

See also 
 Aryl

References 

Hydrolases
EC 3.1.6